is a Japanese footballer who plays for Roasso Kumamoto.

Club statistics
Updated to 23 February 2018.

References

External links
Profile at Roasso Kumamoto
Profile at Blaublitz Akita

1991 births
Living people
Komazawa University alumni
Association football people from Tokyo
Japanese footballers
J1 League players
J2 League players
J3 League players
Nagoya Grampus players
Blaublitz Akita players
Roasso Kumamoto players
Association football goalkeepers